José Ortiz is a paralympic athlete from Spain competing mainly in category B2 marathon events.

Ortiz only ever competed in one event at a single Paralympics, this was the marathon at the 1992 Summer Paralympics in his home country where he finished second to Great Britain's Stephen Brunt.

References

External links
 
 

Paralympic athletes of Spain
Athletes (track and field) at the 1992 Summer Paralympics
Paralympic silver medalists for Spain
Spanish male marathon runners
Living people
Year of birth missing (living people)
Medalists at the 1992 Summer Paralympics
Paralympic medalists in athletics (track and field)
Visually impaired marathon runners
Paralympic marathon runners